Gulberg (Urdu) is an administrative zone in Lahore, Punjab, Pakistan. It forms one of 10 zones of the Lahore metropolitan area.

Neighbourhoods

See also
Lahore District

References

External links
 https://web.archive.org/web/20080423211622/http://www.lahore.gov.pk/town-administration/gulberg-town.aspx Town Government Page
 

 
Central business districts in Pakistan